A shipping pool is a group of similar merchant vessels that are grouped together for administrative purposes. Their earnings are pooled and distributed to the vessel owners according to a prearranged agreement.

Shipping pools
A/S Bulkhandling (established during the 1960s)
NOROBO (established 1984)
NPC/Norwegian Pipecarriers (established 1989)

References

Merchant navy